Night Ferry is an orchestral composition in one movement by the British-born composer Anna Clyne.  The work was commissioned by the Chicago Symphony Orchestra, for which Clyne was then composer-in-residence.  It was first performed February 9, 2012 at Symphony Center, Chicago by the Chicago Symphony Orchestra under conductor Riccardo Muti. A recording by the BBC Symphony Orchestra, conducted by Marin Alsop, was issued in 2020.

Composition
Night Ferry has a duration of roughly 20 minutes and is composed in a single movement.  The work was Clyne's second commission from the Chicago Symphony as composer-in-residence and her second fully orchestral composition.

Inspiration
At the behest of a suggestion from conductor Riccardo Muti, Clyne looked for inspiration from the composer Franz Schubert who suffered from a type of mood disorder known as cyclothymia.  Clyne described this disorder and its inspiration for Night Ferry in the score program notes, writing:
She added, "In its essence, Night Ferry is a sonic portrait of voyages; voyages within nature and of physical, mental and emotional states."  Additionally, the title of the piece is from the Irish poet Seamus Heaney's Elegy for the author Robert Lowell, who also suffered from manic depression.

While composing the work, Clyne simultaneously painted a series of seven large canvasses for cross-inspiration.  She later wrote:

Instrumentation
The work is scored for an orchestra comprising two flutes, piccolo, two oboes, cor anglais, two clarinets, bass clarinet, two bassoons, contrabassoon, four horns, three trumpets, three trombones, tuba, timpani, three percussionists, harp, piano, and strings.

Reception
Reviewing the world premiere, Lawrence A. Johnson of The Classical Review called Night Ferry "a powerful, compelling work displaying the freshness and individuality of the greatly gifted Clyne" and wrote, "...this is an undeniably impressive debut for the 31-year-old composer, especially considering this is only her second work for orchestra."  Although somewhat disappointed by the premiere, John von Rhein of the Chicago Tribune later remarked that the piece had grown on him.  In 2014, he wrote, "The score's roiling strings, jabbing brass and delicate Tibetan singing bowls now come together with an expressive impact I didn't feel at the premiere."

References

Compositions by Anna Clyne
2012 compositions
Compositions for symphony orchestra
Music commissioned by the Chicago Symphony Orchestra